Burj Khalifa/Dubai Mall is a rapid transit station on the Red Line of the Dubai Metro in Dubai. It is one of the busiest stations of the Dubai Metro, with over 3.180 million passengers in 2011.

History
The first station to open after the system's initial opening, Burj Khalifa/Dubai Mall saw service on 4 January 2010. On 26 December 2012, a new walkway directly connecting the station to the Dubai Mall opened, eliminating the need for a bus trip to get to the mall.

Even with the opening of the walkway, the location of the station is not particularly convenient for visitors wishing to go up the Burj Khalifa, as the walk along the walkway and through the mall to the Burj Khalifa is over a mile.

Location

Burj Khalifa/Dubai Mall station is located on the southern side of the interchange between Sheikh Zayed Road, Financial Centre Road and Al Safa St. Directly to the east is the large Downtown Dubai development, containing the Burj Khalifa, the tallest building in the world, and the Dubai Mall, after which the station is named. It is the closest station to a number of major attractions, including The Dubai Fountain and the Address Downtown.

Station layout
Like many stations on the Red Line, Burj Khalifa/Dubai Mall station lies on a viaduct paralleling the eastern side of Sheikh Zayed Road. It is categorised as a type 2 elevated station, indicating that it has two side platforms with two tracks and utilises an elevated concourse between street and platform level.

Platform layout

References

External links
 

Railway stations in the United Arab Emirates opened in 2010
Dubai Metro stations